Waggan City is a city of Kamber@Shahdadkot District in Sindh.

Waggan is located on the Indus Highway 26 km from Larkana City.  It is in the Qamber Shahdadkot District. It has been considered a town since 2023, and has population of approximately 150000.Wagan town is known for giving birth to numerous civil servants (CSPs). Among them CSP Sheeraz Hussain Wagan qualifying CSS in 2009 has become a source of inspiration for the youth of the town. Also,famous Civil Society Activist Nadeem Wagan belongs to this village. Captain Dr Syed Abdul Majeed popularly known as Doctor Wadoo Big or Great Doctor was the pride of Waggan Town;He work thankless for the people of Waggan and they still love him and Our District People's him like is hero.
Groups include Wagan Kalhoro somroo Chandio, Mugheri, Bhand, Abasi, Bughio, Rahojo and Abbasi Totani Tunio Panhwer And Many More. The chairman of the town is Sir Khalil Ahmad Wagan. Every year, Wagan City students select for medical and engineering universities, political leaders  sardar Khalil Ahmad Khan Wagan Meer Jibran Khan Abbasi Zulifuqur Ali Wagan Mumtaz Ali Wagan and Wagan Cast Is Landlord Rich Family some other families are landlord and educated families.
Geo Wagan Attihad

See also 

 Larkana District
 Larkana
 Indus Highway

References

External links
 Wagan City on Google Map

Larkana District